Suuronen is a surname. Notable people with the surname include:
 Matti Suuronen (1933–2013), Finnish architect and designer
 Toni Suuronen (born 1995), Finnish ice hockey player
  (born 1968), Finnish actress

Surnames of Finnish origin